My House My Castle is a New Zealand television reality show that helped New Zealand home owners sort out issues related to their homes such as real estate agents and financing. Also a room is renovated each week and each episode ends with a finalist in the "Castle of the Year Competition". It aired on Monday nights at 8 pm on TV2.

References

External links
My House, My Castle at TVNZ
My House, My Castle at IMDb

New Zealand reality television series
TVNZ 2 original programming
2001 New Zealand television series debuts
2009 New Zealand television series endings
2011 New Zealand television series debuts